Annapurna is a mountain situated in the Annapurna mountain range of Gandaki Province, north-central Nepal.

Maurice Herzog led a French expedition to its summit through the north face in 1950, making it the first eight-thousand meter peak ever successfully climbed. The entire massif and surrounding area are protected within the  Annapurna Conservation Area, the first and largest conservation area in Nepal. The Annapurna Conservation Area is home to several world-class treks, including Annapurna Sanctuary and Annapurna Circuit. 

For decades, Annapurna I Main held the highest fatality-to-summit rate of all principal eight-thousander summits; it has, however, seen great climbing successes in recent years, with the fatality rate falling from 32% to just under 20% from 2012 to 2022. This figure places it just under the most recent fatality rate estimates for K2, at about 24%. It is also a dangerous peak for trekkers, as in the case of a 2014 snowstorm near it and Dhaulagiri which claimed at least 43 lives. As of 2022, 365 people had reached the summit of Annapurna I, while 72 had died in the attempt.

Etymology
The mountain is named after Annapurna, the Hindu goddess of food and nourishment, who is said to reside there. The name Annapurna is derived from the Sanskrit-language words purna ("filled") and anna ("food"), and can be translated as "everlasting food". Many streams descending from the slopes of the Annapurna Massif provide water for the agricultural fields and pastures located at lower elevations.

Climbing expeditions

Annapurna I was the first  peak to be climbed. Maurice Herzog and Louis Lachenal, of the French Annapurna expedition led by Herzog (including Lionel Terray, Gaston Rébuffat, Marcel Ichac, Jean Couzy, Marcel Schatz, Jacques Oudot, Francis de Noyelle), reached the summit on 3 June 1950. Ichac made a documentary of the expedition, called Victoire sur l'Annapurna. Its summit was the highest summit attained for three years, until the first successful ascent of Mount Everest (although higher non-summit points – at least  – had already been attained on Everest in the 1920s).

The south face of Annapurna was first climbed in 1970 by Don Whillans and Dougal Haston also without using supplementary oxygen, members of a British expedition led by Chris Bonington that included Ian Clough, who was killed by a falling serac during the descent. They were, however, beaten to the second ascent of Annapurna by a matter of days by a British Army expedition led by Colonel Henry Day.

In 1978, the American Women's Himalayan Expedition, a team led by Arlene Blum, became the first United States team to climb Annapurna I. The first summit team, composed of Vera Komarkova and Irene Miller, and Sherpas Mingma Tsering and Chewang Ringjing, reached the top at 3:30 pm on 15 October 1978. The second summit team, Alison Chadwick-Onyszkiewicz and Vera Watson, died during this climb.

In 1981 Polish expedition Zakopane Alpine Club set a new route on Annapurna I Central (8051 m). Maciej Berbeka and Bogusław Probulski reached the summit on 23 May 1981. The route called Zakopiańczyków Way was recognized as the best achievement of the Himalayan season in 1981.

On 3 February 1987, Polish climbers Jerzy Kukuczka and Artur Hajzer made the first winter ascent of Annapurna I.

The first solo ascent of the south face was made in October 2007 by Slovenian climber Tomaž Humar; he climbed to the Roc Noir and then to Annapurna East (8,047m).

On 8 and 9 October 2013 Swiss climber Ueli Steck soloed the Lafaille route on the main and highest part of the face; this was his third attempt on the route and has been called "one of the most impressive Himalayan climbs in history", with Steck taking 28 hours to make the trip from Base Camp to summit and back again.

Flights
Several airlines offer sightseeing flights over Annapurna.

Fatality rate
Along with K2 and Nanga Parbat, Annapurna I has consistently ranked as one of the most dangerous of the principal eight-thousander summits. Climbers killed on the peak include Britons Ian Clough in 1970 and Alex MacIntyre in 1982, Frenchman  in 1992, Kazakh Russian Anatoli Boukreev in 1997, Spaniard Iñaki Ochoa in 2008, and Korean Park Young-seok in 2011.

See also
Dhaulagiri
Manaslu
Tilicho lake

References

Bibliography

Further reading

 Chapter 7.

External links

 
 

Eight-thousanders of the Himalayas
Mountains of the Gandaki Province